Jeremy Clarkson's Extreme Machines was a six-part documentary series, originally broadcast on BBC Two in 1998. The series focused on presenter Jeremy Clarkson looking at and driving some of the most impressive record-breaking powerboats, military planes, supertankers, model cars and other vehicles. A BBC Video VHS consisting of the best moments from the series was released prior to the TV premiere, on 20 October 1997.

Episode list

External links

Automotive television series
1990s British documentary television series
1998 British television series debuts
1998 British television series endings
Documentary television series about technology
Driving in the United Kingdom
Sailing in the United Kingdom
BBC television documentaries
English-language television shows